Black Rock is a community in Kings County in the Canadian province of Nova Scotia.

It contains a lighthouse (Black Rock Lighthouse) which was built in 1848. In 1967, the wooden, square lighthouse was replaced by a 10.4 meter tall white fiberglass tower.

References

External links
Black Rock on Destination Nova Scotia

Communities in Kings County, Nova Scotia
General Service Areas in Nova Scotia